Renditions is the debut studio album by Amelia Warner under the name Slow Moving Millie. The album features the songs 'Please Please Please Let Me Get What I Want' which was the song for the John Lewis 2011 Christmas advert, and 'Beasts' which was used in a Virgin Media TV advert. The first eight tracks on the album are covers but 'Beasts' and 'Hart With A Crown & Chain' were written by Amelia Warner and are original tracks for the album. After the first week of release, the album entered the UK Albums Chart at number 89.

Singles
 "Beasts" was released as the album's lead single on 14 August 2009. The song was used for a Virgin Media television commercial.
 "Please, Please, Please, Let Me Get What I Want" was released as the album's second single on 11 November 2011. It peaked at number 31 on the UK Singles Chart. The song was selected as the soundtrack to the John Lewis 2011 Christmas advertisement.

Track listing

Chart performance

Release history

References

2011 albums
Universal Records albums
Island Records albums